Neygu (also Romanized as Neygū) is a village in Raqqeh Rural District, Eresk District, Boshruyeh County, South Khorasan Province, Iran. At the 2006 census, its population was 40, in 10 families.

References 

Populated places in Boshruyeh County